Cardiff Canton TMD is a diesel locomotive traction maintenance depot in Cardiff, Wales. Its depot code is CF. It is operated by Transport for Wales. The depot is used by Transport for Wales fleet and some Cross Country Class 170s.

In steam days the depot was called Cardiff Canton and its shed code was 86C. It was built in 1882 as the main maintenance base for the South Wales Railway and the major Welsh engineering base for the Great Western Railway (GWR). After nationalisation in 1948 it was a heavy overhaul base for British Railways.

After privatisation in the mid-1990s the depot became a joint Arriva Trains Wales and English Welsh & Scottish facility. The EWS depot closed as a maintenance centre from 10 December 2005, but EWS' successor DB Cargo UK still uses the depot for long-term storage and occasional stabling.

History

Steam

The GWR enlarged the depot in 1897 with a -diameter turntable installed in a square locomotive shed with 28 roads radiating of off the turntable. In 1925 the GWR added a locomotive repair and lifting shed and a new coaling stage. In 1931 the original -turntable was removed and replaced by a larger -diameter one at the west end of the yard. At this time, around the peak of GWR operation, the depot had allocated 50 main line passenger locomotives, 40 heavy goods/mineral locomotives and 30 smaller local passenger/goods and shunting locomotives. Steam traction at the depot ceased on 8 September 1962.

Diesel

In the winter of 1962–63, Kyle Stewart contracted to build for British Railways a new £1,324,000 complex on a  site. Lord Brecon, Minister of State for Welsh Affairs, opened the new depot on 18 September 1964.

The original allocation was 360 locomotives for major maintenance, 197 for normal maintenance and 62 shunting locomotives. Employed were 40 managerial and supervisory staff, 31 clerical staff, 382 maintenance staff and 55 unskilled staff.

In 1987, the depot's allocation of rolling stock included Classes 08, 37, 47, 56 and  DMUs, although Classes 33 and 50 could also usually be seen at the depot.

Allocation
Class 08
Class 67
British Rail Mark 4

Class 150
Class 153
Class 158
Class 170
Class 175
Class 197
Class 231
Class 769

References

Sources

Further reading

Buildings and structures in Cardiff
Railway depots in Wales
South Wales Main Line